The Purdue Fort Wayne Mastodons men's basketball statistical leaders are individual statistical leaders of the Purdue Fort Wayne Mastodons men's basketball program in various categories, including points, three-pointers, assists, blocks, rebounds, and steals. Within those areas, the lists identify single-game, single-season, and career leaders. The Mastodons represent Purdue University Fort Wayne (PFW) in the NCAA Division I Horizon League.

PFW began operation on July 1, 2018 following the dissolution of Indiana University – Purdue University Fort Wayne (IPFW), which had been a joint campus of the Indiana University and Purdue University systems. IPFW's academic programs in health sciences were transferred to the new Indiana University Fort Wayne, with all other academic programs being taken over by PFW. The IPFW athletic program, branded as "IPFW" through 2015–16 and "Fort Wayne" in 2016–17 and 2017–18, was transferred in its entirety to PFW, adopting the current athletic branding of "Purdue Fort Wayne" at that time. The history of PFW men's basketball thus begins with IPFW's first season of intercollegiate competition in 1973–74.

A significant complication in statistical recording is that the Mastodons have been members of all three current NCAA divisions. IPFW was initially a member of NCAA Division III (coincidentally in the first season in which the NCAA adopted its current three-division alignment). The university moved to Division II effective with the 1982–83 season, and then to Division I starting in 2001–02.

In Division II, the NCAA did not officially record assists as a statistic until the 1988–89 season, and blocks and steals until the 1992–93 season (this was several years after the same statistics were recorded in D-I). While several conferences experimented with three-pointers earlier in the 1980s, official NCAA records for three-point shooting start for all divisions with the 1986–87 season, when use of the three-pointer was made mandatory throughout NCAA men's basketball with the distance being uniform throughout the sport.

PFW's record books for single-game performances only include performances in the program's D-I era, and season and career three-point records date only to the national adoption of the three-pointer. The PFW record books include leaders in all other statistical categories in all seasons, whether or not the NCAA officially recorded those statistics in the relevant seasons. These lists are updated through the Mastodons' loss to Detroit Mercy in the first round of the 2023 Horizon League tournament. Currently active players are indicated in bold; note that PFW is eligible to appear in secondary national tournaments in the 2022–23 season.

Scoring

Three-pointers

Rebounds

Assists

Steals

Blocks

Footnotes

References

Lists of college basketball statistical leaders by team
Statistical